Babuyan Claro Volcano, also known as Mount Pangasun, is a potentially active volcano located on Babuyan Island, the northernmost of the Babuyan group of islands in Luzon Strait, north of the main island of Luzon in the Philippines. It is classified as one of the active volcanoes of the country with the last confirmed eruption in 1860.  

The volcano is politically located in the similarly-named Barangay of Babuyan Claro, in the Municipality of Calayan, Cagayan province, in the Cagayan Valley Region (Region II) of the country.

Physical features
It has four morphologically-fresh volcanic edifices: Mt. Cayonan in the south, Mt. Naydi  and Mt. Dionisio in the southeast. Babuyan Claro has two very well-preserved craters  in diameter.

The Askedna Hot Spring is located at the southern basal slope of Babuyan Claro. The water is slightly acidic and the silica content is relatively high since the spring flows directly from lava flow deposits. The spring water can be classified as near-neutral sodium chloride brine.

Eruptions
Babuyan Claro has two confirmed historical eruptions: in 1831 and 1860. The eruption on 1913 is listed as uncertain by the Global Volcanism Program of the Smithsonian Institution while the 1917 eruption is confirmed as an eruption of Smith Volcano. Eruptions on Babuyan Claro is determined as probably strombolian or phreatomagmatic by the Philippine Institute of Volcanology and Seismology.

Recent reported activity
In July 1993, there were reports of earthquakes and alleged drying up of vegetation at the upper slopes and summit area of the volcano but volcanologists said the earthquakes were of tectonic in origin and there was no significant change in the volcanic activity.

In February 2004, there were reports of grayish steam clouds hovering above the summit but volcanologists from PHIVOLCS said the seismic swarm was of tectonic origin and the steaming activity was only wispy to weak.

See also
List of active volcanoes in the Philippines
List of potentially active volcanoes in the Philippines
List of inactive volcanoes in the Philippines

References

Stratovolcanoes of the Philippines
Subduction volcanoes
Volcanoes of the Luzon Strait
Mountains of the Philippines
Active volcanoes of the Philippines
Landforms of Cagayan